Anna Cummins (née Mickelson, March 21, 1980) is an American rower who won a gold medal at the 2008 Summer Olympics and a silver medal at the 2004 Summer Olympics in the women's eight. At the FISA World Rowing Championships in 2006, Mickelson won the gold medal in the women's eight with a new world's best time of 5:55.50, and with partner Megan Cooke, she placed 4th in the women's pair.  At the FISA World Rowing Championships in 2007, Mickelson won the gold medal again in the women's eight and won the "B" final in the women's pair.

She rowed in the women's pairs and women's eights at the 2008 Summer Olympics. She won a gold medal in the eights with a time of 6:05.34. The Dutch team won a silver medal with a time of 6:07.22. The Romanian team won a bronze medal with a time of 6:07.25. Other finalists were Canada (fourth), Great Britain (fifth), and Australia (sixth).

Anna grew up in Bellevue, Washington. She graduated from Newport High School. In high school, she ran varsity cross country and track; she played varsity basketball. She attended the University of Washington where she began rowing.  She was a member of Washington's Varsity Eight (first boat) which finished second at NCAA Championships in 2000 and won the NCAA Championship in 2001 and 2002. Washington also won the team championship in 2001.  She also won an NCAA championship in 1999 in the Varsity Four (third boat), her first year of rowing.  She graduated from the University of Washington with a bachelor's degree in communications. She married Dr. Bob Cummins on December 22, 2007.

See also
 Kate Johnson
 Erin Cafaro
 Megan Cooke
 Caryn Davies
 Susan Francia
 Anna Goodale
 Caroline Lind
 Elle Logan
 Lindsay Shoop
 Mary Whipple

References

External links 
 
 
 
 Mickelson Crew: Anna's bio
 US Rowing: Anna (Mickelson) Cummins biography
 Anna Cummins at NBC Olympics
 Turning Silver into Gold

1980 births
Living people
American female rowers
Olympic gold medalists for the United States in rowing
Olympic silver medalists for the United States in rowing
Rowers at the 2004 Summer Olympics
Rowers at the 2008 Summer Olympics
Medalists at the 2008 Summer Olympics
Medalists at the 2004 Summer Olympics
Rowers from Seattle
World Rowing Championships medalists for the United States
21st-century American women